, or "bottle-keep", is a service which is provided at some Japanese drinking establishments where a patron can purchase a bottle of liquor and have the unfinished portion stored until a later visit. A bottle retained in this manner is called a "keep bottle". The service is offered by a variety of drinking establishments, from casual izakaya to bars in some first-class hotels. For regular customers, the system is less expensive than paying for single drinks. Some restaurants and bars outside of Japan have also adopted the service.

References

Japanese cuisine